The 2020–21 KBL season was the 25th season of the Korean Basketball League (KBL), the highest level of basketball in South Korea. There was no defending champion as the previous season was cut short towards the end and the play-offs were cancelled.

Clubs

Regular season

Playoffs

Individual awards

Yearly awards
Most Valuable Player: Song Kyo-chang (Jeonju KCC Egis)
Foreign Player of the Year: Shawn Long (Ulsan Hyundai Mobis Phoebus)
Coach of the Year: Chun Chang-jin (Jeonju KCC Egis)
Rookie of the Year: Oh Jae-hyun (Seoul SK Knights)
KBL Best 5
Heo Hoon (Busan KT Sonicboom)
Song Kyo-chang (Jeonju KCC Egis)
Shawn Long (Ulsan Hyundai Mobis Phoebus)
Lee Dae-sung (Goyang Orion Orions)
Yang Hong-seok (Busan KT Sonicboom)
Sixth Man Award: Jang Jae-seok (Ulsan Hyundai Mobis Phoebus)
Skill Development Award: Jung Chang-young (Jeonju KCC Egis)
Defensive Best 5
Moon Seong-gon (Anyang KGC)
Lee Seoung-hyun (Goyang Orion Orions)
Cha Ba-wee (Incheon Electroland Elephants)
Choi Seung-won (Seoul SK Knights)
Jang Jae-seok (Ulsan Hyundai Mobis Phoebus)
Defensive Player of the Year: Moon Seong-gon (Anyang KGC)
Fair Play Award: Jung Young-sam (Incheon Electroland Elephants)

Individual statistic leaders

Round MVP
The following players were named MVP of the Round:
Round 1: Kim Nak-hyeon (Incheon Electroland Elephants)
Round 2: Song Kyo-chang (Jeonju KCC Egis)
Round 3: Heo Hoon (Busan KT Sonicboom)
Round 4: Shawn Long (Ulsan Hyundai Mobis Phoebus)
Round 5: Heo Hoon (Busan KT Sonicboom)
Round 6: Jared Sullinger (Anyang KGC)

Records
 On 25 March 2021 Song Kyo-chang became the youngest player in KBL history to reach 3000 career points. He had been drafted out of high school in 2015 and is also the first high school graduate to win the regular season MVP.
 Heo Hoon is the first player in KBL history to simultaneously rank first in the statistical categories of scoring (domestic players) and assists (overall).

Notes

References

External Links
  

2020-21
2020–21 in South Korean basketball
2020–21 in Asian basketball leagues